Alan Daniels may refer to:

 Alan Daniels (EastEnders), a fictional character
 Alan F. Daniels (born 1968), American real estate business executive
 Alan Daniels (basketball), in the 2010 NBA Development League draft

. Born 1947. Artist 
Illustration specifically technical. Made art for Honda Toyota and many other car companies. 
Famous for illustrations for national parks and the exon mobile graphics 
His heavenly hussies did for deconstructed women a great favor.